Ferdinando 'Teo' Mora is an Italian mathematician, and since 1990 until 2019 a professor of algebra at the University of Genoa.

Life and work 
Mora's degree is in mathematics from the University of Genoa in 1974.  Mora's publications span forty years; his notable contributions in computer algebra are the 
tangent cone algorithm and its extension of Buchberger theory of Gröbner bases and related algorithm earlier to non-commutative polynomial rings and more recently to effective rings; less significant the notion of Gröbner fan; marginal, with respect to the other authors, his contribution to the FGLM algorithm.
 

Mora is on the managing-editorial-board of the journal AAECC published by Springer, and was also formerly an editor of the Bulletin of the Iranian Mathematical Society.

He is the author of the tetralogy Solving Polynomial Equation Systems:
 Solving Polynomial Equation Systems I: The Kronecker-Duval Philosophy, on equations in one variable
 Solving Polynomial Equation Systems II: Macaulay's paradigm and Gröbner technology, on equations in several variables
 Solving Polynomial Equation Systems III: Algebraic Solving, 
 Solving Polynomial Equation Systems IV: Buchberger Theory and Beyond, on the Buchberger algorithm

Personal life 

Mora lives in Genoa.  Mora published a book trilogy in 1977-1978 (reprinted 2001-2003) called  on the history of horror films.  Italian television said in 2014 that the books are an "authoritative guide with in-depth detailed descriptions and analysis."

See also 

 FGLM algorithm, Buchberger's algorithm 
 Gröbner fan, Gröbner basis 
 Algebraic geometry#Computational algebraic geometry, System of polynomial equations

References

Notes

Further reading 
 .   and  volumes:  , .  Reprinted 2001.
 
  
  
  
 also in:

External links  
 Official page
 Teo Mora and Michela Ceria, Do It Yourself: Buchberger and Janet bases over effective rings, Part 1: Buchberger Algorithm via Spear’s Theorem, Zacharias’ Representation, Weisspfenning Multiplication, Part 2: Moeller Lifting Theorem vs Buchberger Criteria, Part 3: What happens to involutive bases?. Invited talk at ICMS 2020 International Congress on Mathematical Software , Braunschweig, 13-16 July 2020

Year of birth missing (living people)
Living people
Italian mathematicians
Computer algebra
Academic staff of the University of Genoa
University of Genoa alumni